Halton High School is a coeducational, private university/college preparatory secondary school in the city of Toronto, Ontario, Canada. Located in the Birchcliff community in the south eastern section of the city, Halton High School is registered and inspected by the Ontario Ministry of Education (BSID #882713)and offers a program leading to the Ontario Secondary School Diploma. Originally located in Halton Region west of Toronto, the School offers a range of educational services that include: secondary school credit courses, course upgrades, tutoring, and guidance in University and College applications. Access to professional counseling and complete psycho-educational assessments can be provided where indicated.

HHS bases its approach to education on applying the "whole student", outcomes based approach in its instruction, in addition to its focus on individual planning for each student. In order to apply this approach, HHS works closely with specialists in the areas of Special Education, Experiential Education and Educational Psychology, in order to ensure that each student is able to access the accommodations necessitated by their learning profile and the appropriate stimulation in the classroom.

Curriculum 
Halton High School follows the curriculum guidelines established by the Ontario Ministry of Education offering courses at the College, University-College and University Preparatory levels along with opportunities for enriched studies through Advanced Placement courses. In addition to its academic offerings, the School offers a full ESL language program and IELTS test preparation for international 
students.

Student Body 
Halton High School is a multi-disciplinary, multi-cultural, multi-lingual and non-denominational high school that welcomes and embraces students of all cultural backgrounds both domestic and international. Students are enrolled in courses on the basis of ability and previous educational experiences. The School has a selective admissions process and provides an internal transcript evaluation process to determine placement at one of the following levels:

Grade 9

Grade 10

Grade 11

Grade 12

GAP Year - Post-Graduate Preparation

Class sizes vary from 5-8 students, providing close teacher-student interaction and teacher support.

External links

High schools in Toronto
Private schools in Toronto
Private schools in Ontario
International schools in Toronto
Preparatory schools in Ontario